John Winslow Irving (born John Wallace Blunt Jr.; March 2, 1942) is an American-Canadian novelist, short story writer, and screenwriter.

Irving achieved critical and popular acclaim after the international success of The World According to Garp in 1978. Many of Irving's novels, including The Hotel New Hampshire (1981), The Cider House Rules (1985), A Prayer for Owen Meany (1989), and A Widow for One Year (1998), have been bestsellers. He won the Academy Award for Best Adapted Screenplay in the 72nd Academy Awards (1999) for his script of The Cider House Rules.

Five of his novels have been adapted into films (Garp, Hotel, Meany, Cider, Widow). Several of Irving's books (Garp, Meany, Widow) and short stories have been set in and around Phillips Exeter Academy in the town of Exeter, New Hampshire.

Early life
Irving was born John Wallace Blunt Jr. in Exeter, New Hampshire, the son of Helen Frances (née Winslow) and John Wallace Blunt Sr., a writer and executive recruiter; but the couple separated during pregnancy. Irving grew up in Exeter with a stepfather, Colin Franklin Newell Irving, who was a Phillips Exeter Academy faculty member. His uncle Hammy Bissell was also part of the faculty. John Irving was in the Phillips Exeter wrestling program as a student athlete and as an assistant coach, and wrestling features prominently in his books, stories, and life. While a student at Exeter, Irving was taught by author and Christian theologian Frederick Buechner, whom he quoted in an epigraph in A Prayer for Owen Meany. Irving has dyslexia.

Irving's biological father, whom he never met, had been a pilot in the Army Air Forces and, during World War II, was shot down over Burma in July 1943, but survived. (The incident was incorporated into his novel The Cider House Rules.) Irving did not find out about his father's heroism until 1981, when he was almost 40 years old.

Career
Irving's career began at the age of 26 with the publication of his first novel, Setting Free the Bears (1968). The novel was reasonably well reviewed but failed to gain a large readership. In the late 1960s, he studied with Kurt Vonnegut at the University of Iowa Writers' Workshop. His second and third novels, The Water-Method Man (1972) and The 158-Pound Marriage (1974), were similarly received. In 1975, Irving accepted a position as assistant professor of English at Mount Holyoke College.

Frustrated at the lack of promotion his novels were receiving from his first publisher, Random House, Irving offered his fourth novel, The World According to Garp (1978), to Dutton, which promised him stronger commitment to marketing. The novel became an international bestseller and cultural phenomenon. It was a finalist for the National Book Award for Fiction in 1979 (which ultimately went to Tim O'Brien for Going After Cacciato) and its first paperback edition won the Award the next year. Garp was later made into a film directed by George Roy Hill and starring Robin Williams in the title role and Glenn Close as his mother; it garnered several Academy Award nominations, including nominations for Close and John Lithgow. Irving makes a brief cameo appearance in the film as the referee in one of Garp's high school wrestling matches.
 The World According to Garp was among three books recommended to the Pulitzer Advisory Board for consideration for the 1979 Award in Fiction in the Pulitzer Jury Committee report, although the award was given to The Stories of John Cheever (1978).

Garp transformed Irving from an obscure, academic literary writer to a household name, and his subsequent books were bestsellers. The next was The Hotel New Hampshire (1981), which sold well despite mixed reviews from critics. Like Garp, the novel was quickly made into a film, this time directed by Tony Richardson and starring Jodie Foster, Rob Lowe, and Beau Bridges. "Interior Space", a short story originally published in Fiction magazine in 1980, later appeared in the 1981 O. Henry Prize Stories collection.

In 1985, Irving published The Cider House Rules. An epic set in a Maine orphanage, the novel's central topic is abortion. Many drew parallels between the novel and Charles Dickens' Oliver Twist (1838). Irving's next novel was A Prayer for Owen Meany (1989), another New England family epic about religion set in a New England boarding school and in Toronto, Ontario. The novel was influenced by The Tin Drum (1959) by Günter Grass, and the plot contains further allusions to The Scarlet Letter (1850) by Nathaniel Hawthorne and the works of Dickens. In Owen Meany, Irving for the first time examined the consequences of the Vietnam War—particularly mandatory conscription, which Irving avoided because he was a married father when of age for the draft. Owen Meany became Irving's best selling book since Garp.

Irving returned to Random House for his next book, A Son of the Circus (1995). Arguably his most complicated and difficult book, and a departure from many of the themes and location settings in his previous novels, it was dismissed by critics but became a national bestseller on the strength of Irving's reputation for fashioning literate, engrossing page-turners. Irving returned in 1998 with A Widow for One Year, which was named a New York Times Notable Book.

In 1999, after nearly 10 years in development, Irving's screenplay for The Cider House Rules was made into a film directed by Lasse Hallström, starring Michael Caine, Tobey Maguire, Charlize Theron, and Delroy Lindo. Irving also made a cameo appearance as the disapproving stationmaster. The film was nominated for several Academy Awards, including Best Picture, and earned Irving an Academy Award for Best Adapted Screenplay.

Soon afterward, Irving wrote My Movie Business, a memoir about his involvement in creating the film version of The Cider House Rules. After its publication in 1999, Irving appeared on the CBC Television program Hot Type to promote the book. During the interview, Irving criticized bestselling American author Tom Wolfe, saying Wolfe "can't write", and that Wolfe's writing makes Irving gag. Wolfe appeared on Hot Type later that year, calling Irving, Norman Mailer, and John Updike his "three stooges" who were panicked by his newest novel, A Man in Full (1998).

Irving's 10th book, The Fourth Hand (2001), also became a bestseller. In 2004, A Sound Like Someone Trying Not to Make a Sound, a children's picture book originally included in A Widow for One Year, was published with illustrations by Tatjana Hauptmann. Irving's 11th novel, Until I Find You, was released on July 12, 2005.

On June 28, 2005, The New York Times published an article revealing that Until I Find You (2005) contains two specifically personal elements about his life that he had never before discussed publicly: his sexual abuse at age 11 by an older woman, and the recent entrance in his life of his biological father's family.

In his 12th novel, Last Night in Twisted River, published in 2009, Irving's central character is a novelist with, as critic Boyd Tonkin puts it, "a career that teasingly follows Irving's own".

Irving has had four novels reach number one on the bestseller list of The New York Times: The Hotel New Hampshire (September 27, 1981), which stayed number one for seven weeks, and was in the top 15 for over 27 weeks; The Cider House Rules (June 16, 1985); A Widow for One Year (June 14, 1998); and The Fourth Hand (July 29, 2001).

Other projects

Since the publication of Garp made him independently wealthy, Irving has sporadically accepted short-term teaching positions (including one at his alma mater, the Iowa Writers' Workshop) and served as an assistant coach on his sons' high school wrestling teams. (Irving was inducted into the National Wrestling Hall of Fame as an "Outstanding American" in 1992.) In addition to his novels, he has also published Trying to Save Piggy Sneed (1996), a collection of his writings including a brief memoir and unpublished short fiction, My Movie Business, an account of the protracted process of bringing The Cider House Rules to the big screen, and The Imaginary Girlfriend, a short memoir focusing on writing and wrestling. In 2010, Irving revealed that he and Tod "Kip" Williams, director and writer of The Door in the Floor (2004), were co-writing a screenplay for an adaptation of A Widow for One Year (1998).

In 2002, his four most highly regarded novels, The World According to Garp, The Cider House Rules, A Prayer for Owen Meany, and A Widow for One Year, were published in Modern Library editions. Owen Meany was adapted into the 1998 film Simon Birch (Irving required that the title and character names be changed because the screenplay's story was "markedly different" from that of the novel; Irving is on record as having enjoyed the film, however). In 2004, a portion of A Widow for One Year was adapted into The Door in the Floor, starring Jeff Bridges and Kim Basinger.

In 2005, Irving received the Golden Plate Award of the American Academy of Achievement.

In a New York Magazine interview in 2009, Irving stated that he had begun work on a new novel, his 13th, based in part on a speech from Shakespeare's Richard II. Simon & Schuster published the novel, titled In One Person (2012), taking over from Random House. In One Person has a first-person viewpoint, Irving's first such narrative since A Prayer for Owen Meany (Irving decided to change the first-person narrative of Until I Find You to third person less than a year before publication). In One Person features a 60-year-old, bisexual protagonist named William, looking back on his life in the 1950s and '60s. The novel shares a similar theme and concern with The World According to Garp, the latter book being, in part, about "people who hate you for your sexual differences,” said Irving.

He won a Lambda Literary Award in 2013 in the Bisexual Fiction category for In One Person, and was also awarded the organization's Bridge Builder Award to honor him as an ally of the LGBT community.

On June 10, 2013, Irving announced his next novel, his 14th, titled Avenue of Mysteries, named after a street in Mexico City. In an interview the previous year, he had revealed the last line of the book: "Not every collision course comes as a surprise."

On December 19, 2014, Irving posted a message on the Facebook page devoted to him and his work that he had "finished 'Avenue of Mysteries.' It is a shorter novel for me, comparable in length to 'In One Person.'" Irving speculated that "if everything remains on schedule, the English-language editions should be published in fall 2015." Simon & Schuster published the book in November, 2015.

On November 3, 2015, Irving revealed that he'd been approached by HBO and Warner Brothers to reconstruct The World According to Garp as a miniseries. He described the project as being in the early stages.

According to the byline of a self-penned, February 20, 2017 essay for The Hollywood Reporter, Irving completed his teleplay for the five-part series based on The World According to Garp, and he is currently working on his fifteenth novel.

On June 28, 2017, Irving revealed in a long letter to fans on Facebook that his new novel will be, primarily, a ghost story. "...I have a history of being interested in ghosts. And here come the ghosts again. In my new novel, my fifteenth, the ghosts are more prominent than before; the novel begins and ends with them. Like A Widow for One Year, this novel is constructed as a play in three acts. I'm calling Act I 'Early Signs.' I began writing it on New Year's Eve—not a bad night to start a ghost story."

On August 1, 2017, an update about Irving's fifteenth, in-progress, novel, was posted to his Facebook page: "It's been 45 years since John Irving published The Water-Method Man. While his second novel is regarded as a purely comic tale, and John's current project is a darker contemplation of life's disruptive forces, the two novels bear some resemblance to one another. John Irving is once again experimenting with framed narratives and writing about the evolution of a writer—like Bogus Trumper, one who writes screenplays. This time, we see the main character—Adam Brewster—mature, from childhood and early adolescence, to become a writer like Garp, or Ruth Cole, or Juan Diego, as if writing were an inevitability given the fateful circumstances of his life. And, along the way, despite the darkness, there are points of humor. John's work in progress may ultimately be his funniest novel since The Water-Method Man."

In an interview with Mike Kilen for The Des Moines Register, published on October 26, 2017, Irving revealed that the title of his new novel-in-progress is Darkness As a Bride. The title comes from lines in Shakespeare's play, Measure for Measure: "If I must die, / I will encounter darkness as a bride, / and hug it in mine arms." He later changed the title to "The Last Chairlift".

In July 2018, the Dayton Literary Peace Prize announced Irving would be the recipient of the 2018 Richard C. Holbrooke Distinguished Achievement Award at its annual gala October 28, 2018, in Dayton, Ohio.

Works

Novels
 Setting Free the Bears (Random House, 1968) 
 The Water-Method Man (Random House, 1972) 
 The 158-Pound Marriage (Random House, 1974) 
 The World According to Garp (Dutton, 1978) 
 The Hotel New Hampshire (Dutton, 1981) 

 The Cider House Rules (William Morrow, 1985) 
 A Prayer for Owen Meany (William Morrow, 1989) 
 A Son of the Circus (Random House, 1994) 
 A Widow for One Year (Random House, 1998) 
 The Fourth Hand (Random House, 2001) 
 Until I Find You (Random House, 2005) 
 Last Night in Twisted River (Random House, 2009) 
 In One Person (Simon & Schuster, 2012) )
 Avenue of Mysteries (Simon & Schuster, 2015) )
 The Last Chairlift (Simon & Schuster, 2022)

Short fiction
 Trying to Save Piggy Sneed (Arcade Publishing, 1996)

Other fiction
 The Cider House Rules: A Screenplay (1999)
 A Sound Like Someone Trying Not to Make a Sound (children's) (2004)

Nonfiction
 The Imaginary Girlfriend (1995)
 My Movie Business (1999)

Filmography based on writings 
 The World According to Garp (1982) 
 The Hotel New Hampshire (1984)
 Simon Birch (1998) (partly based on A Prayer for Owen Meany)
 The Cider House Rules (1999)
 The Door in the Floor (2004) (from A Widow for One Year)

Personal life
In 1964, Irving married Shyla Leary, whom he had met at Harvard in 1963 while taking a summer course in German, before traveling to Vienna with IES Abroad. They have two sons, Colin and Brendan. The couple divorced in the early 1980s. In 1987, he married Janet Turnbull, who had been his publisher at Bantam-Seal Books and is now one of his literary agents. They have a daughter, Eva Everett, born in 1991. Irving has homes in Vermont, Toronto, and Pointe au Baril, Ontario. On December 13, 2019, Irving became a Canadian citizen, and plans to keep his US citizenship, commenting that he reserves the right to be outspoken about the United States and his dislike of Donald Trump, whom he referred to as vulgar, narcissistic, and xenophobic.

Irving was diagnosed with prostate cancer in 2007 and subsequently had a radical prostatectomy.

Irving is a second cousin of academic and convicted murderer Amy Bishop.

In 2018, Irving was an honorary degree recipient at Williams College.

Notes

References

Further reading
 Derbyshire, Jonathan . John Irving interviewed. New Statesman.

 Sargent, Colin W. "Singular First Person". Portland Magazine, May 2012.
 Shindler, Dorman T.. "John Irving Wrestles Fate". Book, July/August 2001.
 Shindler, Dorman T.. "The Creative Crucible". Pages, July/August 2005.

External links

 

 Literary Encyclopedia
 
 
 The New York Times — Featured Author: John Irving

1942 births
20th-century American male writers
20th-century American non-fiction writers
20th-century American novelists
20th-century American screenwriters
20th-century American short story writers
20th-century memoirists
21st-century American male writers
21st-century American novelists
21st-century Canadian male writers
21st-century Canadian novelists
American children's writers
American emigrants to Canada
American feminist writers
American male non-fiction writers
American male novelists
American male screenwriters
American male short story writers
American memoirists
American social commentators
Best Adapted Screenplay Academy Award winners
Canadian children's writers
Canadian feminist writers
Canadian male non-fiction writers
Canadian male novelists
Canadian male screenwriters
Canadian male short story writers
Canadian memoirists
Canadian social commentators
Iowa Writers' Workshop alumni
Iowa Writers' Workshop faculty
Lambda Literary Award winners
Living people
Members of the American Academy of Arts and Letters
Mount Holyoke College faculty
National Book Award winners
Novelists from Iowa
Novelists from Massachusetts
Novelists from New Hampshire
Novelists from Vermont
People from Exeter, New Hampshire
People from Manchester, Vermont
Writers with dyslexia
Phillips Exeter Academy alumni
Postmodern writers
Screenwriters from Iowa
Screenwriters from Massachusetts
Screenwriters from New Hampshire
Screenwriters from Vermont
University of New Hampshire alumni
Writers about activism and social change
Writers of historical fiction set in the modern age